V. S. Krishna Iyer (7 January 1922 – 25 July 2011) was an Indian politician and independence movement activist from the state of Karnataka. He had served as a Member of Parliament of 8th Lok Sabha for Bangalore South from 1984 to 1989.

Career 
Krishna also served as mayor of Bangalore and Minister in the state cabinet before being elected to Lok Sabha, the lower house of Indian Parliament from Bangalore South constituency in the 1984 Lok Sabha elections. He also served as the Deputy Chairman of the Karnataka Legislative Assembly. V.S. Krishna Iyer had occupied various posts like Mayor of Bangalore City (1962–63), MLC, Dy.Chairman M.P. of Bangalore City.

Death 

Krishna Iyer died on 25 July 2011 after a prolonged illness.

Notes

References 
 
 

Lok Sabha members from Karnataka
India MPs 1984–1989
2011 deaths
1922 births
Mayors of Bangalore
Indian independence activists from Karnataka
Janata Party politicians